Cédrick Desjardins (born September 30, 1985) is a Canadian former professional ice hockey goaltender. He played with the Tampa Bay Lightning of the National Hockey League (NHL).

Playing career

Juniors
Cédrick Desjardins (nicknamed Cédrick the Entertainer) was drafted in 2002 by the Rimouski Océanic in the QMJHL, 200th overall. He started his career in the QMJHL in 2002–03 with the Rimouski Océanic. He had 1 win in 23 games.

In the 2004–05 QMJHL season, he became the number one goalie on the team, leading the Océanic, along with the forward Sidney Crosby, to the Memorial Cup final, where they lost 4-0 to the London Knights.

In the off-season, Desjardins was traded to the Quebec Remparts. Undrafted and as a 20-year-old player that meant it was his last year in the QMJHL. In the QMJHL finals against the Moncton Wildcats, they lost the series 4-2, but they went to the Memorial Cup tournament because Moncton was the host team. In the Memorial Cup finals against the Wildcats, Desjardins stopped 46 of 48 shots on the way to a 6-2 win and the 2006 Memorial Cup. He also won the Hap Emms Memorial Trophy as the most valuable goaltender at the tournament.

Professional
In 2006, Desjardins was invited to the Chicago Blackhawks training camp before signing a two-year contract with the Hamilton Bulldogs of the American Hockey League on July 26, 2006. For the 2006–07 season on October 11, 2006 the Bulldogs assigned Desjardins to the Cincinnati Cyclones of the ECHL in which after his first week as a professional he was named the ECHL's "Reebok" player of the week. He was re-called to the Hamilton Bulldogs on December 5, 2007 when Jaroslav Halak was called up to the NHL's Montreal Canadiens. He was again called up on February 26, 2008, following Montreal's trade of Cristobal Huet.

In the ensuing 2007–08 season Desjardins played a further 12 games with the Bulldogs but primarily helped the Cyclones win the 2008 ECHL Kelly Cup Championship, and for his efforts won the Kelly Cup Playoffs MVP Award.

During the 2009–10 season, Desjardins had a stellar year with the Hamilton Bulldogs. He played in 47 games and had an astounding 29-9-4 record with 6 shutouts and leading the league with a 2.00 Goals against average to win the Harry "Hap" Holmes Memorial Award. Desjardins also appeared in the AHL All-Star Game in which he was named the top goaltender in the skills competition and at season's end he earned selection to the AHL Second All-Star Team.

On July 20, 2010, Desjardins re-signed to a one-year contract with the Canadiens. However, on August 16, 2010, he was traded by the Canadiens to the Tampa Bay Lightning for Karri Rämö. On December 30, 2010, he started his first NHL game, playing against the Canadiens. He recorded a win, stopping 27 of 28 shots for a 4-1 Lightning victory.

On July 8, 2011, Desjardins signed a one-year contract with the Colorado Avalanche. After starting the 2011–12 season injured from off-season shoulder surgery, Desjardins was assigned to affiliate, the Lake Erie Monsters, upon recovery. Throughout the season Desjardins was plagued by injury, however in 32 games with the Monsters, Desjardins set Monsters season records in save percentage and goals against average, while also selected as Lake Erie's lone All-Star representative in the 2012 AHL All-Star game. On February 16, Desjardins was briefly recalled by Colorado to serve as the backup goalie in place of the injured Jean-Sébastien Giguère, however never played with the Avalanche.

On July 1, 2012, Desjardins signed a one-year, two-way contract to return to his original NHL team, the Montreal Canadiens. Reassigned to his familiar stomping grounds in Hamilton to start the 2012–13 season, Desjardins suffered from injury and registered only 7 wins in 22 games for the cellar dwelling Bulldogs.

On February 14, 2013, Desjardins again retraced his footsteps when he was traded from the Canadiens to the Tampa Bay Lightning for a second time in exchange for another goalie, Dustin Tokarski.

On July 1, 2014, Desjardins left the Lightning organization for a second time and signed a two-year two-way contract with the New York Rangers.

On December 26, 2014, while playing for the New York Rangers AHL affiliate, the Hartford Wolfpack, he tore his ACL, ending his season. On December 8, 2015, almost a full year after sustaining his injury, Desjardins was cleared to play and assigned to begin his 2015-16 campaign with the Manchester Monarchs of the ECHL to begin his comeback from rehabilitation.

Career statistics

Awards and honours

References

External links

1985 births
Living people
Canadian ice hockey goaltenders
Cincinnati Cyclones (ECHL) players
Hamilton Bulldogs (AHL) players
Hartford Wolf Pack players
Ice hockey people from New Brunswick
Indy Fuel players
Lake Erie Monsters players
Manchester Monarchs (ECHL) players
Norfolk Admirals players
People from Edmundston
Quebec Remparts players
Rimouski Océanic players
Syracuse Crunch players
Tampa Bay Lightning players
Undrafted National Hockey League players